Echinosepala is a proposed genus of orchids comprising the subgenera Silenia and Satyria of the genus Myoxanthus. There is little reason to resist this change, thus Echinosepala is widely accepted. The genus contains 8 species.

The genus was formerly known as Echinella Pridgeon & M.W.Chase, but as this latter also refers to an algae genus, it has been changed to Echinosepala.

List of species 
Echinosepala aspasicensis (Rchb.f.) Pridgeon & M.W.Chase, (2002). 
Echinosepala balaeniceps (Luer & Dressler) Pridgeon & M.W.Chase, (2002). 
Echinosepala lappiformis (A.H.Heller & L.O.Williams) Pridgeon & M.W.Chase, (2002). 
Echinosepala pan (Luer) Pridgeon & M.W.Chase, (2002). 
Echinosepala sempergemmata (Luer) Pridgeon & M.W.Chase, (2002). 
Echinosepala stonei (Luer) Pridgeon & M.W.Chase, (2002). 
Echinosepala tomentosa (Luer) Pridgeon & M.W.Chase, (2002). 
Echinosepala uncinata (Fawc.) Pridgeon & M.W.Chase, (2002).

References 

 
Pleurothallidinae genera